Odd Einar Nordheim (born February 5, 1972, in Årdal) is a Norwegian musician and singer. He won the music talent competition Stjerner i sikte in 1996. He has released two albums under the name "OdD", Mind Your Head in 2001 and Not All Birds Fly with Ease in 2005. He was nominated for best pop solo performer under Spellemannprisen 2001.

His musical inspirations are Otis Redding, Billie Holiday, Prince, Jimi Hendrix, The Police, Tom Waits and Joni Mitchell. Nordheim participated in The Voice – Norges beste stemme in 2012. His mentor in the program was Madcon's Yosef Wolde-Mariam. By the end of August 2020, he was contestant in NRK's 9th season of Stjernekamp. In the 6th episode he went out of the song competition.

Nordheim is currently living in Siggerud. In November 2020 he released his first studio album in 15 years, written and performed in his native dialect Sognemål.

Discography

 2001 – Mind Your Head
 2005 – Not All Birds Fly with Ease
 2020 –  Mi Sognbok

References

20th-century Norwegian male singers
20th-century Norwegian singers
1972 births
Musicians from Årdal
Living people
21st-century Norwegian male singers
21st-century Norwegian singers